Andrea Morrell is a former American rugby union player. She was a member of the  team that won the inaugural 1991 Women's Rugby World Cup in Wales. She was inducted into the United States Rugby Hall of Fame along with the 1991 World Cup squad in 2017.

References 

Year of birth missing (living people)
Living people
Female rugby union players
American female rugby union players
United States women's international rugby union players